The tie is a symbol in the shape of an arc similar to a large breve, used in Greek, phonetic alphabets, and Z notation. It can be used between two characters with spacing as punctuation, non-spacing as a diacritic, or (underneath) as a proofreading mark. It can be above or below, and reversed. Its forms are called tie, double breve, enotikon or papyrological hyphen, ligature tie, and undertie.

Uses

Cyrillic transliteration

In the ALA-LC romanization for Russian, a tie symbol is placed over some combinations of roman letters that are represented by a single letter in the Cyrillic alphabet, e.g., T͡S for Ц and i͡a for я. This is not uniformly applied, however: some letters corresponding to common digraphs in English, such as sh for ш and kh for х do not employ the tie. In practice, the tie ligature is often omitted.

Greek

The enotikon (henōtikón,  "uniter", from  "a serving to unite or unify"), papyrological hyphen, or Greek hyphen was a low tie mark found in late Classical and Byzantine papyri. In an era when Greek texts were typically written scripta continua, the enotikon served to show that a series of letters should be read as a single word rather than misunderstood as two separate words. (Its companion mark was the hypodiastole, which showed that a series of letters should be understood as two separate words.)

The enotikon was also used in Greek musical notation, as a slur under two notes. When a syllable was sung with three notes, this slur was used in combination with a double point and a diseme overline.

Vocal music scores 

In musical score engraving, the undertie symbol is called an "elision slur" or "lyric slur", and is used to indicate synalepha: the elision of two or more spoken syllables into a single note; this is in contrast to the more common melisma, the extension of a single spoken syllable over multiple sung notes. Although rare in English texts, synalepha is often encountered in musical lyrics written in the Romance languages.

In use, the undertie is placed between the words of the lyric that are to be sung as one note to prevent the space between them being interpreted as a syllable break. For example, in the printed lyric "the‿im - mor - tal air", the undertie between "the" and "im-" instructs the singer to elide these two syllables into one, thus reducing five spoken syllables into four sung notes.

International Phonetic Alphabet 
The International Phonetic Alphabet uses two type of ties: the ligature tie (IPA #433), above or below two symbols and the undertie (IPA #509) between two symbols.

Ligature tie 
The ligature tie, also called double inverted breve, is used to represent double articulation (e.g. ), affricates (e.g. ) or prenasalized consonants (e.g. ) in the IPA. It is mostly found above but can also be found below when more suitable (e.g. ).

On computers, it is encoded with characters  and, as an alternative when ascenders might be interfering with the bow, .

Undertie 
The undertie is used to represent linking (absence of a break) in the International Phonetic Alphabet. For example, it is used to indicate liaison (e.g. ) but can also be used for other types of sandhi.

This is a spacing character, not to be confused with the alternative (below-letter) form of the ligature tie (a͜b ), which is a combining character.

Uralic Phonetic Alphabet 
The Uralic Phonetic Alphabet uses several forms of the tie or double breve:
 The triple inverted breve or triple breve below indicates a triphthong
 The double inverted breve, also known as the ligature tie, marks a diphthong
 The double inverted breve below indicates a syllable boundary between vowels
 The undertie is used for prosody
 The inverted undertie is used for prosody.

Other uses 

The double breve is used in the phonetic notation of the American Heritage Dictionary in combination with a double o, o͝o, to represent the near-close near-back rounded vowel ( in IPA).

The triple breve below is used in the phonetic writing Rheinische Dokumenta for three-letter combinations.

In the field of computing, the Unicode character  is used to represent concatenation of sequences in Z notation. For example, "s⁀t" represents the concatenation sequence of sequences called s and t, while the notation "⁀/q" is the distributed concatenation of the sequence of sequences called q.

In proofreading, the undertie was used to indicate that word in a manuscript had been divided incorrectly by a space. (See Hyphen#Origin and history).

Encoding 

The diacritic signs triple inverted breve, triple breve, and double inverted breve have not yet been encoded for computers.

Unicode has characters similar to the tie:
  and 
  and 
 , which is a proofreading mark

See also 
 Typographic ligature
 Legato
 Breve
 Inverted breve
 Underscore

References 

Greek-script diacritics
Palaeography
Phonetic transcription symbols
Punctuation
Typography
Ancient Greek punctuation